La Rioja—Logroño until 1982—is one of the 52 constituencies represented in the Congress of Deputies, the lower chamber of the Spanish parliament, the Cortes Generales. The constituency currently elects four deputies. Its boundaries correspond to those of the Spanish province of La Rioja. The electoral system uses the D'Hondt method and a closed-list proportional representation, with a minimum threshold of three percent.

Electoral system
The constituency was created as per the Political Reform Act 1977 and was first contested in the 1977 general election. The Act provided for the provinces of Spain to be established as multi-member districts in the Congress of Deputies, with this regulation being maintained under the Spanish Constitution of 1978. Additionally, the Constitution requires for any modification of the provincial limits to be approved under an organic law, needing an absolute majority in the Cortes Generales.

Voting is on the basis of universal suffrage, which comprises all nationals over eighteen and in full enjoyment of their political rights. The only exception was in 1977, when this was limited to nationals over twenty-one and in full enjoyment of their political and civil rights. Amendments to the electoral law in 2011 required for Spaniards abroad to apply for voting before being permitted to vote, a system known as "begged" or expat vote. 348 seats are elected using the D'Hondt method and a closed list proportional representation, with an electoral threshold of three percent of valid votes—which includes blank ballots—being applied in each constituency. Each provincial constituency is entitled to an initial minimum of two seats, with the remaining 248 being distributed in proportion to their populations. Ceuta and Melilla are allocated the two remaining seats, which are elected using plurality voting. The use of the D'Hondt method may result in a higher effective threshold, depending on the district magnitude.

The electoral law allows for parties and federations registered in the interior ministry, coalitions and groupings of electors to present lists of candidates. Parties and federations intending to form a coalition ahead of an election are required to inform the relevant Electoral Commission within ten days of the election call—fifteen before 1985—whereas groupings of electors need to secure the signature of at least one percent of the electorate in the constituencies for which they seek election—one-thousandth of the electorate, with a compulsory minimum of 500 signatures, until 1985—disallowing electors from signing for more than one list of candidates. Also since 2011, parties, federations or coalitions that have not obtained a mandate in either chamber of the Cortes at the preceding election are required to secure the signature of at least 0.1 percent of electors in the aforementioned constituencies.

Deputies

Elections

November 2019 general election

April 2019 general election

2016 general election

2015 general election

2011 general election

2008 general election

2004 general election

2000 general election

1996 general election

1993 general election

1989 general election

1986 general election

1982 general election

1979 general election

1977 general election

References

Congress of Deputies constituencies (Spain)
Politics of La Rioja (Spain)
1977 establishments in Spain
Constituencies established in 1977